The Permanent Way Institution is a technical Institution which aims to provide technical knowledge, advice and support to all those engaged in rail infrastructure systems worldwide.

Permanent Way is used to describe the course of a railway line, including the components that form the track, aggregate that supports the track and the civil engineering assets covering bridges, tunnels, viaducts and earthworks.

Sections 

The Permanent Way Institution is split up into a number of sections throughout the United Kingdom and also has internationally located sections across the world.

Membership is open to anyone who is either actively involved in the rail industry, retired or just has a general interest in rail infrastructure engineering.

Home Sections are:

Ashford, 
Croydon & Brighton, 
Glasgow, 
London, 
North Wales, 
Wessex, 
Birmingham, 
Darlington & NE, 
Manchester & Liverpool,  
Nottingham & Derby, 
South & West Wales, 
West Yorkshire, 
Bristol & West of England, 
Edinburgh, 
Lancaster, Barrow & Carlisle, 
Milton Keynes, 
Sheffield & Doncaster, 
Thames Valley, 
York

Membership Grades
Student/Apprentice
Member (holders can use the post-nominal letters MPWI)
Fellow (holders can use the post-nominal letters FPWI)
The Permanent Way Institution has been a licensed member of the Engineering Council since 2019, and can assess and register candidates with Engineering Technician (EngTech), Incorporated Engineer (IEng) and Chartered Engineer (CEng) status.

Presidents 
 1884, William Meredith Lewis (founded the Permanent Way Institution)
 1922, Alfred W. Szlumper
 1926, Alexander Newlands

Publications
The Journal (technical journal published quarterly)
Understanding Track Engineering - An essential introduction to the theory and practice of railway track engineering in the UK
Design of Railway Switches & Crossings in Flat Bottom Rail
Design of Railway Track in Bull Head Rail
Plain Line Maintenance of Track
Switch & Crossing Track Maintenance
Track Terminology

References

External links 
 Permanent Way Institution home page

Rail infrastructure in the United Kingdom